Dunmaglass may refer to:
 Dunmaglass, Nova Scotia
 Dunmaglass, Scotland